The 1995 Central Michigan Chippewas football team represented Central Michigan University in the Mid-American Conference (MAC) during the 1995 NCAA Division I-A football season.  In their second season under head coach Dick Flynn, the Chippewas compiled a 4–7 record (2–6 against MAC opponents), finished in seventh place in the MAC, and were outscored by their opponents, 276 to 255.  The team played its home games in Kelly/Shorts Stadium in Mount Pleasant, Michigan, with attendance of 95,292 in five home games.

The team's statistical leaders included quarterback Chad Darnell with 1,737 passing yards, tailback Silas Massey with 1,089 rushing yards, and flanker Bryan Schorman with 604 receiving yards. Massey was named MAC Freshman of the Year.  Linebacker Cory Gildersleeve was selected as the team's most valuable player. Center Brock Gutierrez and free safety Quincy Wright were selected as first-team All-MAC player.

Schedule

References

Central Michigan
Central Michigan Chippewas football seasons
Central Michigan Chippewas football